Saleh Khalifa Al-Dosari (born 2 May 1954) is a Saudi Arabian footballer who played for Al-Ettifaq and the Saudi national team. He competed in the men's tournament at the 1984 Summer Olympics.

He is the younger brother of former Al-Nahda player Ahmed Khalifa and the older brother of Al-Ettifaq teammate Eissa Khalifa.

Honours

Club
Al-Ettifaq
Saudi Premier League: 1982–83, 1986–87
King Cup: 1985
Saudi Federation Cup: 1990–91
Arab Club Champions Cup: 1984, 1988
Gulf Club Champions Cup: 1983, 1988

Saudi Arabia
AFC Asian Cup: 1984

References

External links
 

1954 births
Living people
People from Dammam
Association football midfielders
Saudi Arabian footballers
Saudi Arabia international footballers
Olympic footballers of Saudi Arabia
Saudi Professional League players
Saudi First Division League players
Ettifaq FC players
Footballers at the 1984 Summer Olympics
Asian Games silver medalists for Saudi Arabia
Asian Games bronze medalists for Saudi Arabia
Asian Games medalists in football
Footballers at the 1978 Asian Games
Footballers at the 1982 Asian Games
Footballers at the 1986 Asian Games
Medalists at the 1982 Asian Games
Medalists at the 1986 Asian Games
20th-century Saudi Arabian people